Adoor Pankajam (1925 – 26 June 2010) was an Indian actress, in Malayalam movies. She hailed from Adoor in Pathanamthitta district of Kerala state. Mainly, she was a supporting actress and a comedian. Her sister Adoor Bhavani was also a Malayalam cinema actress.

Pankajam's most noted performance was in the national award winning film Chemmeen as "Nalla Pennu". She also did a pivotal role in India's first neo-realistic film Newspaper Boy (1955). In 2008, Kerala Sangeetha Nataka Academy honoured Pankajam and Bhavani for their overall contributions to theatre and drama. 

She died at the age of 85 on 26 June 2010.

Personal life

Adoor Pankajam was born to Adoor Paarappurathu Kunjuraman Pillai and Kunjoonjamma in 1925 and was the second child of 8 children. Her sister Adoor Bhavani also became famous later through plays and movies.

She could only study till 4th standard due to financial difficulties. But still she continued her music studies under Pandalam Krishnapillai Bhagavathar till the age of 11. By this time, she had done musical kacheri in most of the temples around her village.

At 12, she started acting in Kannur Kerala Kalanilayam troupe against the will of her parents. She acted in their play Madhumadhurayam on over 300 stages. Her next play was Rakthabhandham by a theater in Chengannoor. In this play, she did a comic role which was widely accepted.

She met Devarajan Potti, the owner of Kollam Bharatha Kalachandrika while she was working with this troupe and later married him. Potti later started another troupe called Parthasarathy Theaters and during her tenure with this troupe, she got an invitation to act in movies.

She has a son named Ajayan, who is a cinema/TV serial actor.

Career

She started her acting career with the stage play Madhu Madhuryam by Kalanilayam Theaters. Her first movie was Premalekhanam, produced by Pappa Soman. But her first movie which got released was Vishappinte Vila, directed by Boban Kunchacko. Her last movie was the Dileep-starrer Kunjikoonan. She has acted in over 400 films during her career.

In 1976, she and her sister Adoor Bhavani started a Theater troupe called Adoor Jaya Theaters. But later the sisters got split up and Bhavani left the Theater. Pankajam went on with the theater with her husband Devarajan Potti and she kept the Theater active for over 18 years.

In 2008, Kerala Sangeetha Nataka Academy honoured Pankajam and Bhavani for their overall contributions to theatre and drama. She has also received the Kerala State Film Award for Second Best Actress for her performance in the movie Sabarimala Ayyappan.

Filmography

Dramas
Parithranayam
Pamsula
Homam
Rangapooja
Paashupathrasthram
Madhumadhurayam
Rakthabhandham
Kalyanachitti

TV Serial
  Parinamam

References

External links
 
 Celebrating 40 years of a movie classic
 AMMA to give monthly aid to 18 film stars
 Adoor Pankajam at MSI

1925 births
2010 deaths
Indian film actresses
Actresses from Kerala
Actresses in Malayalam cinema
Actresses in Malayalam television
People from Pathanamthitta district
20th-century Indian actresses
Malayalam comedians
Indian women comedians
21st-century Indian actresses
Actresses in Tamil cinema